McCaw Ridge is an isolated ridge lying  south of the central part of Ueda Glacier, near the base of the Antarctic Peninsula. It was mapped by the United States Geological Survey from surveys and U.S. Navy air photos, 1961–67, and was named by the Advisory Committee on Antarctic Names for D. McCaw, a construction electrician at South Pole Station in 1963.

See also
Jaeger Hills

References

Ridges of Palmer Land